Claytonia perfoliata (syn. Montia perfoliata), also known as miner's lettuce, Indian lettuce, winter purslane, or palsingat (Cahuilla), is a flowering plant in the family Montiaceae. It is an edible, fleshy, herbaceous, annual plant native to the western mountain and coastal regions of North America.

Description
The cotyledons are usually bright green (rarely purplish- or brownish-green), succulent, long and narrow.

The flowers appear from February to May or June and are grouped 5–40 together. The flowers grow above a pair of leaves that are connected together around the stem so as to appear as a single circular leaf. Mature plants form a rosette; they have numerous erect to spreading stems that branch from the base.

C. perfoliata is common in the springtime, and prefers a cool, damp environment. The plant first appears in sunlit areas after the first heavy rains of the year, though the best stands are found in shaded areas, especially in the uplands, into early summer. As the days get hotter and drier, the leaves turn a deep red color as they dry out.

Taxonomy
Together with two other Claytonia species, Claytonia parviflora and C. rubra, C. perfoliata comprises what is almost certainly a polyploid pillar complex, which is based on three diploid species.  Two key studies on the population ecology and genetics of the C. perfoliata complex were published in 2012.

Subspecies 
There are three well-studied geographical subspecies of C. perfoliata:
 Claytonia perfoliata subsp. perfoliata: Pacific coastal United States and Canada (British Columbia)
 Claytonia perfoliata subsp. intermontana: interior western United States
 Claytonia perfoliata subsp. mexicana: coastal southern California and Arizona, all the way south to Mexico to Guatemala

Other names
C. perfoliata is called piyada̠ʼ in the Western Mono language and palsingat in Ivilyuat — two Native American languages of California.

Distribution and habitat
The species can be found from southernmost Alaska and central British Columbia, all the way south to Central America, but most common in California in the Sacramento and northern San Joaquin Valleys. As of 2019 sightings of this plant have been found as far inland as Arkansas.

Uses

The common name of miner's lettuce refers to how the plant was used by miners during the California Gold Rush, who ate it to prevent scurvy. It is in season in April and May, and can be eaten as a leaf vegetable. The entire plant is edible, except the roots, and it provides vitamin C. Most commonly, it is eaten raw in salads, but it is not quite as delicate as cultivated lettuce. Sometimes, it is boiled like spinach, which it resembles in taste and chemical composition. Caution should be used because wild C. perfoliata can sometimes accumulate toxic amounts of soluble oxalates (also present in spinach).

The plant is known as palsingat or, possibly, lahchumeek in Ivilyuat and it was eaten fresh or boiled as a green by the Ivilyuqaletem (Cahuilla) of Southern California. It, along with Claytonia exigua, is available for gathering in the early spring.

It has been widely naturalized in western Europe, after being introduced there in the 18th century, possibly by the naturalist Archibald Menzies, who brought it to Kew Gardens in London in 1794.

References

External links

 Flora North America Claytonia perfoliata
 Calflora database: Claytonia perfoliata (Miner's lettuce)
 Jepson Flora Project: Claytonia perfoliata
 Plants of British Columbia: Claytonia perfoliata

perfoliata
Flora of Alaska
Flora of British Columbia
Flora of California
Flora of Central America
Flora of Mexico
Flora of Idaho
Flora of Oregon
Flora of the California desert regions
Flora of the Sierra Nevada (United States)
Flora of Washington (state)
Natural history of the California chaparral and woodlands
Natural history of the Central Valley (California)
Taxa named by Carl Ludwig Willdenow
Taxa named by Aimé Bonpland
Annual plants
Leaf vegetables
Lettuce
Plants used in Native American cuisine
Pre-Columbian California cuisine
Flora without expected TNC conservation status